At the 1976 Summer Olympics in Montreal, 37 events were contested in athletics. There were a total number of 1005 participating athletes from 80 countries.

The men's 50 kilometres walk competition was dropped from the Olympic athletics programme, despite its constant presence at the games since 1932. The IAAF chose to host its own world championship event instead, a month and a half after the Olympics. This foreshadowed the creation of the IAAF World Championships in Athletics in the following years.

Medal summary

Men

Women

Medal table

Notes

References

External links
 Athletics at the 1976 Montréal Summer Games. Sports Reference. Retrieved on 2012-06-04.
 International Olympic Committee results database
 Athletics Australia

 
Athletics
Olympic Games
1976
1976 Olympic Games